Tamil inscriptions in Sri Lanka date from the centuries before Christ to the modern era. The vast majority of inscriptions date to the centuries following the 10th century AD, and were issued under the reigns of both Tamil and Sinhala rulers alike. Out of the Tamil rulers, almost all surviving inscriptions were issued under the occupying Chola dynasty, whilst one stone inscription and coins of the Jaffna Kingdom have also been found.

Most inscriptions are of a Hindu or Buddhist nature, or record the exploits of merchants, soldiers, officials and kings.

The longest Tamil inscription in the island is from the Lankatilaka Vihara, for which historian K. Indrapala states the following:

Early Anurādhapura period (300 BC – 300 AD)

Anaikoddai seal, Jaffna

Tissamaharama coins with Tamil Brahmi legends

Tamil letters and words in Prakrit inscriptions

Late Anurādhapura period (8th–9th centuries AD)

Abhayagiriya Tamil Buddhist inscription, Anurādhapura

Ruvanvalisaya Tamil Buddhist inscription, Anurādhapura

Pankuḷiya Tamil Buddhist inscription, Anurādhapura

Nānkunāṭṭār Tamil Buddhist Inscription from Anurādhapura

Two slab inscriptions from Hindu ruins, Anurādhapura

Chola period (993–1070 AD)

Nilaveli Slab Inscription in the reign of Rajaraja I, Trincomalee

Koneswaram inscription of Rajaraja I, Trincomalee

Kielekadawala Siva kovil inscription of Rajaraja I, Trincomalee

Padaviya inscription of the reign of Rajaraja I

Tirukketisvaram inscription in the reign of Rajaraja I, Mannar

Tirukketisvaram inscriptions in the reign of Rajendra Chola I, Mannar

Pathirakali Amman temple inscription of Rajendra Chola I, Trincomalee

Slab inscription of Rajendra Chola I from Trincomalee Fort

Two fragmentary Chola Inscriptions from Kayts Fort, Jaffna

Siva Devale No. 2 inscription, Polonnaruwa

Three fragmentary Chola inscriptions from Polonnaruwa

Three fragmentary Chola inscriptions from Siva Devale No. 2, Polonnaruwa

Four short inscriptions from Siva Devale No. 1, Padaviya

Kantaḷāy Chola Lankeswaran inscription, Trincomalee

Mānānkēni Chola Lankeswaran inscription, Trincomalee

Sangilikanadarawa Chola inscription, Anuradhapura

Diyavinna inscription, Sabaragamuwa

Sixteen Tamil Buddhist inscriptions from Velgam Vihara, Trincomalee

Atakada inscription recording endowment to Saiva Temple

Four pillar inscriptions from Polonnaruwa

Ainnurruvar Slab inscription from Ataragala, Puttalam

Colombo museum Rajendra Chola II inscription

Medirigiriya Tamil slab inscription, Polonnaruwa

Vanavanmatevi-isvaram inscription, Polonnaruwa

Chola inscription from Jaffna Fort

Chola era Tamil inscriptions from Thirumangalai, Trincomalee

Ainnurruvar Polonnaruva Bolappaḷḷi inscription

Polonnaruwa period (1070–1215 AD) 

Following the expulsion of the Cholas, Vijayabāhu I retained their administrative structure and made significant changes only at the top. The reference to a register of Tamil clerks (Demaḷa lesdaru pota) in Vijayabāhu's Panakaduva Copper Plate inscription points to his employment of Tamil officers in the administration. Possibly many of them continued in service from the time of Chola rule.

Vēḷaikkārar slab inscription of Vijayabahu I, Polonnaruwa

Palamottai slab inscription in the reign of Vijayabahu I, Trincomalee

Padaviya Virasasana inscription

Kulnoor potters' inscription, Trincomalee

Budumuttava Virakkoti inscription

Vahalkada slab inscription, Anurādhapura

Viharehinna merchant inscription, Dambulla

Kodaliparichan inscription of Vēḷaikkārar Mūvēntavēḷān in the years of Jayabahu I, Vavuniya

Kantaḷāy inscription in the years of Jayabahu I, Trincomalee

Kantaḷāy gal āsana inscription, Trincomalee

Mankanay pillar inscription of Gajabahu II, Trincomalee

Mayilankulam Vēḷaikkārar inscription in the years of Jayabahu I, Trincomalee

Budumuttava pillar inscriptions in the years of Jayabahu I, Kurunegala

Puliyankulam pillar inscription of Jayabahu I, Anurādhapura

Rankot Vihara Velaikkaran inscription of Jayabahu I, Polonnaruwa

Mailawewa Vēḷaikkārar pillar inscription, Trincomalee

Moragahavela inscription in the reign of Gajabahu II, Polonnaruwa

Mahakirindegama pillar inscription in the reign of Gajabahu II, Anurādhapura

Hingurakdamana pillar inscription in the reign of Gajabahu II, Polonnaruwa

Kantaḷāy pillar inscriptions of Gajabahu II, Trincomalee

Polonnaruwa pillar inscription of Gajabahu II

Galtampitiya Virakkoṭi inscription

Nainativu Tamil inscription of Parakramabahu I, Jaffna

Panduvasnuvara inscription of Nissanka Malla

Jetavana Nānādesi bronze image, Anurādhapura

Ridiyegama Nānādesi Bronze seal, Hambantota

Transitional period (1215–1619 AD)

Gomarankadawala rock inscription of Magha, Trincomalee

Thampalakamam Slab inscription of Magha, Trincomalee

Rankot Vihara Vēḷaikkāran Matevan inscription, Polonnaruwa

Villunti Kantucuvami Koyil inscription of Buddhapriya, Trincomalee

Welikanda Ainnurruvar slab inscription

Dediyamulla Virakkoti slab inscription, Kurunegala

Perilamaiyar inscriptions of Padaviya

Fragmentary inscription from Anurādhapura museum 

(The following three Sanskrit inscriptions have been included for completion, as they were issued by Tamils.)

Padaviya Sanskrit bronze seal

Vēḷaikkārar Sanskrit Buddhist inscription of Padaviya

Sanskrit inscription of Codaganga from Trincomalee

Fragmentary inscription from Periyapuliyankulam, Vavuniya

Kankuveli inscription, Trincomalee

Mehiyalla inscription

Kotagama slab inscription of Arya Chakravarti, Kegalle

Lankatilaka Vihara inscription of Bhuvanaikabahu IV

Galle trilingual inscription of Zheng He

Thirukkovil pillar inscription, Amparai

Munnesvaram inscription of Parakramabahu VI

Fragmentary Jaffna inscription of Parakramabahu VI

Naimmana inscription of Parakramabahu VI, Matara

Kalutara pillar inscription

Tamil pillar inscription in the reign of Vijayabahu VI

Thambiluvil inscription of Vijayabahu VI, Amparai

Coins of the Jaffna Kingdom

Trincomalee Fort Koneswaram inscription

Thirumangalai Temple Bell inscription, Trincomalee

Late Kandyan period (1619 - 1815 AD)

Kankuveli Agasthi Stapana Kovil inscription, Trincomalee

Veeramunai Copper plates in the reign of Senarat, Amparai

Sammanthurai Copper plates in the reign of Rajasinghe II, Amparai

Verugal Copper Plates of the Vanniyar, Trincomalee

References 

Sri Lanka inscriptions
Sri Lankan Tamil history
Tamil inscriptions
Tamil language-related lists